The Assumptionists, formally known as the Congregation of the Augustinians of the Assumption (abbreviated AA), is a worldwide congregation of Catholic priests and brothers. It is active in many countries.  The French branch played a major role in French political and social history in the 19th century.

Founder

Born in Le Vigan on August 30, 1810, Emmanuel d'Alzon received his initial formation in the major seminary of Montpellier (1832–1833) which he completed in Rome. A student of Félicité de Lamennais, he broke with his former mentor but remained influenced by several of his ideas. He launched numerous pastoral initiatives in the diocese of Nîmes under successive bishops : Claude Petit Benoit de Chaffoy (1822–1835), Jean-François-Marie Cart (1837–1855), Claude-Henri Plantier (1855–1875), and François-Nicolas Besson (1875–1878). D'Alzon founded two congregations, one for men (the Assumptionists) and one for women (the Oblates of the Assumption).

D'Alzon resigned from his post as vicar general in 1878 after 43 years of service. With his first disciples he undertook bold apostolic goals: the foreign missions (Australia, eastern Europe), education, the press, and pilgrimages. He died on November 21, 1880, in Nîmes and was declared Venerable by Pope John Paul II in December 1991.

Assumptionists/Augustinians of the Assumption
The congregation had its origin in the College of the Assumption, established in Nîmes, France, in 1843, by the Rev. d'Alzon vicar-general of that diocese. Organized in 1847, the members took their public vows at Christmas of the next year. A second house was established in Paris, and they continued their work there. The congregation was formally approved by a Brief of 26 November 1864. The chief objects of the congregation are to combat the spirit of irreligion in Europe and the spread of schism in the East. To this end the Assumptionists have devoted themselves to the work of Catholic higher and secondary education, to the spread of truth by means of the Press, to the conduct of pilgrimages, and to missionary work in the East. In addition to their college at Nîmes they established Apostolic schools where poor students were educated for the priesthood without expense to themselves.

In the 1870s, the Assumptionists established "La Bonne Presse" which issued periodicals, pamphlets, and books in great numbers and expanded into one of the largest Catholic publishing houses in the world, Bayard Presse. They founded one of the oldest and most influential daily newspapers in France, La Croix. In English-speaking countries its best known publication is Catholic Digest.

In 1873 these religious also began a series of large-scale pilgrimages both within France and to the Holy Land which developed into such current endeavors as the popular national pilgrimage to Lourdes every year on the occasion of the feast of the Assumption, gathering thousands of pilgrims.

Their activities at the time of the Dreyfus Case aroused controversy. The Assumptionists actively promoted the conspiracy theory that unnamed Jews were destroying French institutions, in particular the Army and the Catholic church, and oppressing the people. One of many examples of their unsourced anti-Semitic polemic can be taken from their widely-circulated daily newspaper, La Croix, for 2 February 1898:

Chaque semaine, les Juifs, qui emploient le fisc à cette triste besogne, se ruent sur les biens de gens désarmés; on vole, au nom de la secte, le pain des pauvres; ça et là, des misérables consentent à acheter à bas prix les immeubles sous la direction occulte du syndicat juif,

(Each week, the Jews, who exploit tax law in this sorry task, seize the goods of defenceless people; in the name of their sect, the bread of the poor is stolen; here and there, wretched people agree to buy buildings at knockdown prices under the secret instruction of the Jewish conspiracy.)

No proof of these assertions is given and no Jewish person or organisation is identified. This overt hate campaign no doubt contributed to the subsequent laws which curtailed the activities of the Assumptionists in France. 

When the Republican party came to power, it required religious orders to be reorganized and registered. Some organizations, including the Assumptionists, refused and went into exile instead. In 1900 the congregation was suppressed within French territory, this action being based on the charge that they were accumulating a fund to be used in a royalist movement to overthrow the Republic. Many priests went abroad; other remained in France as secular priests under the authority of local bishops.

At the time of their "suppression" the Assumptionists maintained twenty Apostolic schools which were all closed. The congregation then took up the work in other quarters. Similar schools have been established in Italy, Belgium, England, and the United States. "La Bonne Presse" was purchased at the time of the suppression by Paul Feron-Vrau, a wealthy manufacturer of Lisle, and all its publications were continued without any change. Much of the good accomplished by the Assumptionists was effected through this medium. No popular Catholic paper had reached a degree of circulation equal to that of "La Croix". In Chile, they publish in Spanish "Echoes from the Sanctuary of Lourdes". In their journalistic work they were aided by the Oblate Sisters of the Assumption, an order established by d'Alzon to assist in their Oriental missions, but whose activities are not contained to that field. Until the suppression they directed the women's section in the publishing rooms of the "Christian Press" as well as the hospitals, orphan asylums, and schools.

Among other works carried on by the Assumptionists in France prior to their suppression was that of the "Association of Our Lady of Salvation", a society devoted to prayer, almsgiving, and setting a good example for the reformation of the working class. This society was established in eighty dioceses, and it succeeded in drawing the higher classes of society more closely to the workingmen. It encouraged everywhere social prayer, and social and national expiation, and discouraged human respect, social apostasy, and isolation in piety. It raised funds to convey workmen, pilgrims, paupers, and sick poor to Lourdes to the number of a thousand each year; it was zealous in the cause of workmen's clubs, and of Catholic Schools, and was active in the movement in favour of the keeping of Sunday as a day of rest.

Another field of missionary labour was found among the Newfoundland fishermen. Every year 12,000 or 15,000 fishermen left the coasts of France, Belgium, and Ireland, to go to the Banks of Newfoundland for codfish. The Assumptionists organized prominent catholic sailors into a committee and were encouraged to equip two hospital ships to aid the fishermen. The vessels were wrecked twice, but replaced.

In 1925, the Assumptionists absorbed the English branch of the Fathers of St. Edmund, also known as the Oblates of the Sacred Heart of Jesus and of the Immaculate Heart of Mary, founded in 1843 by Dom Muard.

On 11 November 1952 at the central prison of Sofia, Bulgaria three Assumptionist priests (Augustinians of the Assumption), Kamen Vitchev, Pavel Djidjov and Josaphat Chichov were executed by firing squad by the Communist regime. All three have since been beatified as martyrs for the faith.

Present day
The current Rule of Life of the congregation draws its inspiration from that of St. Augustine of Hippo. This international congregation is present in nearly 30 countries throughout the world, with the most recent foundations being established in 2006 in the Philippines, Vietnam, and Togo. The congregation has long been involved in education, the press, ecumenism, pilgrimages, and the missions.

At the General Chapter of 2011, a French priest Benoit Griere, was elected on 11 May to succeed Father Richard Lamoureaux- who had served the maximum of two successive six-year terms-as the 10th superior general. The religious institute's new superior general, a physician, theologian, and ethicist, was born in 1958 in Chauny, France. He studied medicine in Reims, France, and simultaneously began his formation as a candidate for the Assumptionist priesthood in seminary, studying philosophy and sacred theology. He entered the Assumptionists in 1991 and was ordained to the priesthood in 1995. According to the 2012 Annuario Pontificio, the Augustinians of the Assumption number 882 religious, of whom 541 are priests, in 125 communities.

The Assumption family
There are thirteen religious congregations which, in one capacity or another, trace their roots either directly to the three major founding figures (Rev. Théodore Combalot, 1797–1873, Saint Marie-Eugénie de Jésus Milleret de Brou, 1817–1898, and Fr. Emmanuel d'Alzon, 1810–1880) or indirectly under the inspiration. Members are present in over 60 countries throughout the world.

In addition to the Assumptionists, a number of other congregations belong to the larger Assumption Family: The Religious (Sisters) of the Assumption, the Oblates (Missionary Sisters) of the Assumption, the Little Sisters of the Assumption, the Orantes of the Assumption, the Sisters of St. Joan of Arc, the Brothers of the Assumption, the Little Sisters of the Presentation of Our Lady, the Missionary Sisters of the Assumption, and the Sisters of the Cross.

Original Assumptionist congregations
Of the six original congregations of the Assumption, five originated in France and are made up of men only .

The Religious Sisters of the Assumption

The Congregatiion of the Religious of the Assumption was founded in Paris (Seine), Férou Street, in 1839. The foundress, Mother Marie-Eugénie de Jésus (Marie-Eugénie Milleret de Brou), was born in Metz on August 25, 1817. After being received into the Church in 1836, she met Rev. Théodore Combalot in 1837. Under his inspiration, she founded with four other women, a religious congregation, after having trained with the Benedictines of the Blessed Sacrament in Paris and with the Visitation Sisters of Mt. St. Andrew (Isère). At the age of 22, in 1839, she was elected superior of the new congregation. In 1841 Fr. d'Alzon became her spiritual guide. She made her final vows at Christmas 1844, and resigned as superior general in 1894. The mother-house was located in the Auteuil mansion from 1857 till their expulsion in 1900 when they moved to Val Notre-Dame in Belgium. The generalate is located in Paris.

Missionary Sisters of the Assumption
The Missionary Sisters of the Assumption (M.S.A.) were founded in 1849 in Grahamstown (South Africa) as a result of a split with the Religious of the Assumption. The original mother-house was located in Grahamstown, but was later transferred to Johannesburg. The first superior general was Mother Marie-Gertrude Henningsen (1822–1904). The current superior general is Sr Barbara Standing. There are approximately 70 religious in 10 communities.

Augustinians of the Assumption
The Augustinians of the Assumption, known as the Assumptionists (A.A.), founded by Emmanuel d'Alzon at Nîmes, France.

Assumption Oblate Sisters
The Oblates of the Assumption (O.A.) were founded in May 1865 in Rochebelle du Vigan (Gard) by Fr. d'Alzon and Marie Correnson, known in religion as Mother Emmanuel-Marie de la Compassion (1842–1900), as the women's branch of the Augustinians of the Assumption. From a middle class Nîmes family, Correnson was born in Paris on July 28, 1842. Fr. d'Alzon chose her to be the first superior general. The congregation focused on Christian unity.

Little Sisters of the Assumption

Little Sisters of the Assumption L.S.A. were founded in Paris (Seine) in July 1865 by Fr. Etienne Pernet, A.A. (1824–1899) and Sr. Antoinette Fage, known in the convent as Mother Marie de Jésus (1824–1883). The congregation, from its foundation, has been dedicated to the home care of the sick poor. They were first recognized in 1875 by Cardinal Guibert, the Archbishop of Paris, and by Rome in 1897 and 1901. The Sisters of Charity of the Assumption (S.C.A.) were founded as a result of a split with the Little Sisters of the Assumption in Italy in 1993. They are associated with the Comunione e Liberazione Movement.

The Orantes of the Assumption
The Orantes of the Assumption (Or. A.) were founded by Fr. François, Picard, A.A. (1831–1903) and Isabelle de Clermont-Tonnerre, known in religion as Mother Isabelle of Gethsemani. It has remained a modest-sized congregation. In 1941 it incorporated the Sacramentine Sisters of Marseille, founded in 1639 by Fr. Antoine Le Quien, O.P.

In a booklet, entitled, "Origins of the Religious Families of the Assumption," Fr. Pierre Touveneraud, A.A. (1926–1979), former general archivist of the congregation, summarized in 1972 the common patrimony of the six original branches of the Assumption which, while fully respecting their particular vocations, their autonomous governing structures, and their apostolic works, bears witness to their common history strengthened by spiritual friendship, apostolic support, and fraternal collaboration. Some of the traits they share are: an Augustinian spirituality, Christocentrism (special emphasis on the mystical Incarnation and the Kingdom of God), love of the Church and the centrality of the Eucharist, love of Mary, strong common life, common prayer, the role of study. He also points out some of the difficulties, tensions, trials and misunderstandings that occurred over the years among the various members of the Family.

There are other aspects as well which they share: the similarities of their rules of life, a missionary commitment, an insistence on certain human virtues (openness, simplicity, warmth), a balance of the three constitutive elements of religious life (prayer, community, and apostolate), emphasis on co-responsibility in governance, collaboration with the laity, and the importance of belonging to an international family.

Twentieth-century foundations

Other foundations of the Assumption Family took place in the 20th century and not all of them bear the name "Assumption" even if they owe their origin to an Assumptionist.

 The Sisters of St. Joan of Arc (S.J.A.) were founded in 1914 in Worcester, Massachusetts (USA) by Fr. Marie-Clément Staub, A.A and Sr. Jeanne du Sacre Coeur, born Célina Benoît. (1876–1936). The mother-house was established in Sillery, Québec in 1917.
 The Servas Obreras Catequistas (S.O.C.) were founded in Argentina by Fr. Joseph-Marie Moreau, A.A. (1897–1947) in 1934.
 The Sisters of the Cross were founded in Athens in 1939. Their mother-house is located on Ipirou Street Agia Paraskevi. This congregation was founded by Fr. Elpide Iannis Stephanou, A.A.(1896–1978).
 The Brothers of the Assumption were founded in 1951 in Beni (Democratic Republic of the Congo) by Bishop Henri Piérard, A.A. (1893–1975), as a lay diocesan institute for the diocese of Beni-Butembo. It has remained a small congregation.
 The Little Sisters of the Presentation of Our Lady were founded in 1948 also by Bishop Piérard as a diocesan institute. Its mother-house is now located in Butembo, North Kivu (DRC).
 The Little Missionaries of the Cross were founded in Bogotá in 1955. They later became and remain a secular institute with no particular link to the Assumptionists.

Especially since the 1970s, the various congregations of the Assumption Family have highlighted in a more visible way their common origins and their similarities of spirit and life. These efforts have led to greater exchanges and shared programs: inter-novitiates, assemblies, get-togethers of young members of the Assumption Family, colloquia, annual meetings of the general councils of the congregations, joint foundations, collaboration on a provincial level, and the joint preparation of two magazines (Assomption et ses oeuvres and Itinéraires Augustiniens).

Assumptionist spirituality
In 1993, a series of articles gathered under the title, The Spirit of Assumption according to Emmanuel d'Alzon described Assumptionist spirituality.

Augustinian
Renowned Augustinian scholar, Fr. Fulbert Cayré (1884–1971), who holds to an Augustinian definition of the charism: the Assumption was born of Augustinian inspiration as evidenced, among other things, by its name, its rule, the institute it founded (Les Etudes augustiniennes), the number of references to St. Augustine in the founder's writings (he once wrote that the City of God should be for the Assumption "a kind of second revelation"), and the many Assumptionist authors in the Augustinian tradition (Cayré, Edgar Bourque, Marcel Neusch, Goulven Madec, Ernest Fortin, George Folliet, Rémi Munsch, etc.).

Christocentrism
Fr. Athanase Sage (1896–1971), analyzed Fr. d'Alzon's writings comprehensively and edited the Écrits spirituels, a compendium of the basic writings of the founder. Sage focuses  on the thought of the founder and using themes constitutive of his thinking, of his spiritual life, and his apostolic  work: Kingdom, Mystical Incarnation, Christocentrism, the Augustinian tradition, and the influence of the French school of spirituality (Bérulle, Bossuet, Olier, etc.), which d'Alzon shared with Mother Marie Eugénie.

Trinitarian
Assumptionist systematic theologian, Fr. George Tavard (1922–2007), a Frenchman living in the United States, places the emphasis on the deeply Trinitarian inspiration of d'Alzon's writings, articulated around themes and actions which champion the rights of God.

References

Further reading
 Mather, Judson Irving. "La Croix and the Assumptionist response to secularization in France, 1870-1900" PhD Dissertation. University of Michigan, 1971.

External links
 
 Augustinians of the Assumption - U.S. Region, North American Province

 
Religious organizations established in 1845
Catholic religious institutes established in the 19th century
1845 establishments in France
Antisemitism in France